Magnesium bicarbonate or magnesium hydrogencarbonate, Mg(HCO3)2, is the bicarbonate salt of magnesium. It can be formed through the reaction of dilute solutions of carbonic acid (such as seltzer water) and magnesium hydroxide (milk of magnesia).

It can be prepared through the synthesis of magnesium acetate and sodium bicarbonate:

Magnesium bicarbonate exists only in aqueous solution. Magnesium does not form solid bicarbonate as does lithium. To produce it, a suspension of magnesium hydroxide is treated with pressurized carbon dioxide, producing a solution of magnesium bicarbonate:

Mg(OH)2 + 2 CO2 → Mg(HCO3)2

Drying the resulting solution causes the magnesium bicarbonate to decompose, yielding magnesium carbonate, carbon dioxide, and water:

Mg2+ + 2 HCO3− → MgCO3 + CO2 + H2O

References

Magnesium compounds
Bicarbonates